This is a list of former Australian Rules Football competitions in the Australian state of Victoria.

Metropolitan competitions

Country competitions
 Alberton Football League (1946-2019)
Ararat District Football Association (1928–1999)
Clubs included Caledonians, Halls Gap, St Marys, Prestige, Trinity, Great Western, Moyston, Glenorchy, Swifts, Warriors, Miners
Bacchus Marsh Football League (1919–1973)
Merged with Ballarat District Football League to form the Ballarat and Bacchus Marsh Football League.
Bairnsdale District Football League (1948–1972)
Merged with Gippsland Football League to form the East Gippsland Football League
Bairnsdale Bruthen District Football League (1928–1953)
Ballarat District Football League (1959–1973)
Merged with Bacchus Marsh Football League to form the Ballarat and Bacchus Marsh Football League.
Ballarat and Bacchus Marsh Football League (1974–1978)
Merged with Clunes Football League to form the Central Highlands Football League.
Bass Valley Football League (1946–1954)
Bass Valley Wonthaggi Football League (1955–1995)
Castlemaine Football Association (1894-1951)
Central Gippsland Football League (1902–1953)
Central Glenelg Football League (1934–1959)
Central Goulburn Football League (1998-2005)
Central Wimmera (1922–1968)
Clubs included Natimuk, Noradjuha, Horsham seconds, Pimpinio, Quantong,
Clunes Football League (1931–1978)
Merged with Ballarat and Bacchus Marsh Football League to form the Central Highlands Football League.
Corangamite Football League (1925–1934)
Cowwarr Football League (1909–1954)
Merged with Sale District Football League to form the North Gippsland Football League.
East Gippsland Football League (1920–1939)
Echuca Football League (1952–1989)
Merged with the Northern Districts Football League to form the Northern & Echuca Football League. Clubs included Echuca East, Echuca South, Bawamn, Lockington, Moama, Bunnaloo

Gippsland Football League (1901–1973)
Merged with Bairnsdale District Football League to form the East Gippsland Football League

Glenelg & District Football Assoc (1945–1959)
Glenelg Football League (1960–1969)

Golden City Football League (1960–1980)

Heytesbury Football League (1980–1991)
Merged with the Mount Noorat Football League to form the Heytesbury Mount Noorat Football League

Heytesbury Mount Noorat Football League (1992-2002)

Korong Football League (1908–1949)
Kowree-Naracoote Football League (1937–1991)
Merged with Tatiara Football League to form Kowree Naracoorte Tatiara Football League
Lexton Football League (1945–1998) 
Merged with Western Plains Football League to form the Lexton Plains Football League

Linton Carngham Football League (1936–1952)
Clubs included Berringa, Bradvale, Carngham, Illabarook, Mannibadar, Scarsdale, Skipton, Smythesdale and Vite Vite.
Lowan Star Football Association (1923–1968)
Minor competition in the Nhill district. Clubs included Boyeo, Gerang, Kiata, Lorquon, Netherby, Winiam, and Yanac. Second XVIII's from Nhill, Jeparit and Dimboola competed at different stages.
Mallee Football Association (1902–1934)
Mid Murray Football League (1934–1997)
Merged with Northern & Echuca Football League to form the Central Murray Football League
Mountain Creek Football Association (1922-1933)
Mount Noorat Football League (1932–1991)
Merged with the Heytesbury Football League to form the Heytesbury Mount Noorat Football League
Nepean Football League (1959-1986)
Hived off by the Mornington Peninsula FL committee only to merge later to form the Mornington Peninsula Nepean Football League.
Neerim District Football Association (1907–1951)
Northern Mallee Football League (1979–1996)
Merged with Southern Mallee Football League to form the Mallee Football League.
Northern Districts Football League (1953–1989)

Northern & Echuca Football League (1990–1996)
League merged with Mid Murray FL to form Central Murray Football League.
Otway Football Association (1931–1956)
Ouyen District Football League (1910–1955)
Panton Hill Football League
Polwarth Football League (1922–1970)
Became the Bellarine Football League
Port Campbell Football League 
Port Fairy Football League (1923–1969)
Portland District Football League (1955–1969)
Purnim Football League (1931-1969)
Purnim Heytesbury Football League (1970-1979)
 Resultant merge of senior and junior football leagues.
Riviera Football League (1986–2003)
Second division clubs broke away from East Gippsland Football League
Sale District Football League (1946–1954)
Merged with Cowwarr Football League to form the North Gippsland Football League.
South Gippsland Football Association (1919-1932)
South Gippsland Football League (1933-1952)
South Gippsland Senior Football League (1954)
 Leongatha, Korumburra and Mirboo were barred from joining the Latrobe Valley Football League.
 All towns supplied two teams each for a six team competition.
South Gippsland Football League (1955-1970)
South West Gippsland Football League (1954–1994)
Southern Mallee Football League (1932–1996)
Merged with Northern Mallee Football League to form the Mallee Football League.
Tambo Valley Football Association (1907–1925)

Tatiara Football League (1911–1992)
Merged with Kowree-Naracoorte Football League to form Kowree Naracoorte Tatiara Football League
Tyrrell Football League (1945–1978)
Wallacedale District Football League (1935–1954)
Waranga North East Football League (1913–1976)

West Gippsland Football League (1927–2001)
Western District Football League (1923–1963)
Merged with SE Border FL to form Western Border Football League
Western And Moira Football Association (1906-1933)
Renamed the Picola & District Football League
Western Plains Football League(1930–1998)
Merged with Lexton Football League to form the Lexton Plains Football League

 Winchelsea Football Association (1896-1921)
Forerunner of the Polwarth Football Association. Teams included Birregurra, Deans Marsh, Forrest & Winchelsea.
 Yackandandah District Football Association (1928-1932) & (1946-1953)
 Yarrawonga District Football Association (1891-1912)
 Yarra Valley Football League (1919-1965)
 Merged with the Mountain District Football League to form the Yarra Valley Mountain District Football League

References

 
Victoria, Former competitions in